Le Cordon Bleu College of Culinary Arts in Boston was established in 2007 in Massachusetts. The college is owned by Career Education Corporation under a licensing agreement with Le Cordon Bleu in Paris. All US Le Cordon Bleu College locations are scheduled to close in 2017.

Programs 
Le Cordon Bleu College of Culinary Arts in Boston offers the Associate of Applied Science Degree in Le Cordon Bleu Culinary Arts. LCB includes a complete curriculum, with general education classes such as Math and English. The program is designed to be 12 months of coursework on campus, and then three months work in an externship. Graduates should be prepared for entry- to mid-level positions including cook, apprentice chef, or kitchen manager in a variety of professional environments.

Campus 
Le Cordon Bleu College of Culinary Arts in Boston’s campus includes lecture rooms, industrial kitchens, a library, computer labs, a full-service, student staffed fine dining restaurant, opening in early 2009,  a student bookstore, and administrative offices. No on-campus housing is provided, however LCB will help students find housing in the area.

Accreditation 
Le Cordon Bleu College of Culinary Arts, Inc., a private two year college, is accredited by the Accrediting Commission of Career Schools and Colleges of Technology (ACCSCT) to award the Associate in Applied Science degree.

The Massachusetts Board of Higher Education approves Le Cordon Bleu College of Culinary Arts, Inc., a private two year college, to offer the Associate in Applied Science Degree in Le Cordon Bleu Culinary Arts.

The College is associated with the American Culinary Federation and the Career College Association.

References

External links 
 Le Cordon Bleu College of Culinary Arts in Boston

Cooking schools in the United States
Defunct private universities and colleges in Massachusetts
Former for-profit universities and colleges in the United States
Educational institutions established in 2007
Universities and colleges in Cambridge, Massachusetts
Career Education Corporation
2007 establishments in Massachusetts
Educational institutions disestablished in 2017